Frederick Lippman (born April 13, 1935) was an American politician from the state of Florida.

Lippman was born in Brooklyn, New York, and attended Columbia University and the Columbia University College of Pharmacy. He was a pharmacist. He served in the Florida House of Representatives for the 100th district from 1978 to 1999, as a Democrat.

References

Democratic Party members of the Florida House of Representatives
Politicians from Brooklyn
Columbia University College of Pharmacy alumni
Living people
1935 births